Founded by U.S. Army Brigadier General George Miller Sternberg, MD in 1893, the Army Medical School (AMS) was by some reckonings the world's first school of public health and preventive medicine. (The other institution vying for this distinction is the Johns Hopkins School of Public Health (1916).) The AMS ultimately became the Army Medical Center (1923), then the Walter Reed Army Institute of Research (1953).

History
Sternberg created the AMS by issuing "General Order 51" on June 24, 1893. The School was housed, along with the Army Medical Library in the building of the Army Medical Museum and Library (affectionately known as the "Old Pickle Factory" or "Old Red") at 7th Street and South B Street (now Independence Avenue), SW, Washington, D.C. (This site is on the National Mall where the Smithsonian's Hirshhorn Museum now stands.)

In 1910, the AMS relocated to 721 13th Street, NW and in 1916 to 604 Louisiana Avenue.

In 1923, the "Army Medical Center" (AMC) was created when (1) the AMS became the "Medical Department Professional Service School" (MDPSS) and (2) the MDPSS moved into "Building #40" on the grounds of the Walter Reed General Hospital (WRGH) in northern Washington, D.C.

The historic edifice known as Building #40 was constructed at 14th and Dahlia Streets beginning in 1922 and reached completion in 1932.  This facility consists of four "Pavilions":

The North or "Vedder Pavilion" (named for Col. Edward Bright Vedder (1878-1952) who established polished rice extract as the proper treatment for beri-beri);
The South or "Craig Pavilion" (named for Col. Charles Franklin Craig (1872-1950) who in the Philippines proved (1907; with Percy M. Ashburn)  dengue to be a filterable agent (virus) and later showed the mosquito Aedes aegypti responsible for dengue transmission);
The East or "Sternberg Pavilion" (named for Gen. Sternberg (1838-1915), the U.S. Army Surgeon General and co-discoverer of the pneumococcus, known as the "Father of American Bacteriology");
The West or "Siler Pavilion" (named for Col. Joseph Franklin Siler (1875-1960), who in  1925 first injected dengue virus in serum into humans producing disease and "closing the loop" on dengue transmissibility).

In 1947, the MDPSS became the "Army Medical Department Research and Graduate School" (AMDRGS), which in turn became the "Army Medical Service Graduate School" (AMSGS) in 1950.

In September 1951, "General Order Number 8" combined the WRGH & AMC into the present-day Walter Reed Army Medical Center (WRAMC).  Three years later, the research elements of this facility became the present-day Walter Reed Army Institute of Research (WRAIR).

List of presidents and commandants

See also

Buildings
Army Medical Museum and Library
Building 40 (Army Medical School)

Notable people associated with the AMS and AMC 
Graduates:
Brig. Gen. Carl Rogers Darnall ('97), also Professor of Chemistry, Center Commander, developed (1910) chlorination of drinking water
Brig. Gen. Roger Brooke ('02)

Others:
Brig. Gen. George Miller Sternberg
Major Walter Reed
Colonel Edward Bright Vedder
Charles Franklin Craig 
Colonel Joseph Franklin Siler
Frederick F. Russell
Maurice Hilleman, famed vaccinologist, Chief of Dept of Respiratory Diseases (1948–57)
Brig. Gen. Russell Callendar, Commandant when the tropical medicine course was created in 1941
Colonel George W. Hunter III, faculty of the Tropical and Military Medicine Course, author of Manual of Tropical Medicine (now Hunter's Tropical Medicine)
Captain Daniel Carleton Gajdusek, later a Nobel Prize winner (and child molester); assigned to AMSGS (1951–53).

References

 Craig, COL Stephen C., "The Evolution of Public Health Education in the U.S. Army, 1893-1966", Army Medical Department Journal, PB 8-06-2, April-June 2006, pp 7-17.

Medical School
Medical School
Medical School
Educational institutions established in 1893
1893 establishments in Washington, D.C.